Pablo Dyego da Silva Rosa (born 8 March 1994), known as Pablo Dyego, is a Brazilian footballer who plays for CRB, on loan from Fluminense. Mainly a forward, he can also play as a right back.

Club career
Dyego is a youth product of Fluminense academy.

During the 2013 pre-season, he signed for Djurgårdens IF on loan. Pablo made his Djurgårdens IF debut in Allsvenskan on 4 May 2013 against Åtvidabergs IF.

On 19 June 2015, Dyego joined Polish Ekstraklasa club Legia Warsaw on season-long loan.

On 2 March 2016, Dyego signed with Canadian club Ottawa Fury on a season-long loan.

On 6 February 2017, Diego joined San Francisco Deltas on loan.

Career statistics

Honours
Legia Warsaw
 Polish Cup: 2015–16

References

External links 
 
 Djurgården profile 
 

1994 births
Fluminense FC players
Djurgårdens IF Fotboll players
Legia Warsaw players
Ottawa Fury FC players
San Francisco Deltas players
Brazilian footballers
Living people
Association football midfielders
Brazilian expatriate footballers
Expatriate footballers in Poland
Expatriate footballers in Sweden
Expatriate soccer players in Canada
Allsvenskan players
Ekstraklasa players
North American Soccer League players
Campeonato Brasileiro Série A players
Campeonato Brasileiro Série B players
Clube de Regatas Brasil players
Atlético Clube Goianiense players
Footballers from Rio de Janeiro (city)